Okoyemovka is a rural locality (a selo) in Kurbusakhsky Rural Okrug of Ust-Aldansky District in the Sakha Republic, Russia, located  from Borogontsy, the administrative center of the district and  from Us-Kyuyol, the administrative center of the rural okrug. Its population as of the 2002 Census was 221.

References

Notes

Sources
Official website of the Sakha Republic. Registry of the Administrative-Territorial Divisions of the Sakha Republic. Ust-Aldansky District. 

Rural localities in Ust-Aldansky District